U-Turn, also known as The Girl in Blue, is a 1973 Canadian drama film directed by George Kaczender and starring David Selby and Maud Adams. It was entered into the 23rd Berlin International Film Festival.

Cast
 David Selby as Scott Laithem
 Maud Adams as Paula / Tracy
 Gay Rowan as Bonnie
 William Osler as Professor Bamberger
 Diane Dewey as Holly
 Michael Kirby as Kippie
 Walter Wakefield as Old man
  as Sidewalk artist
 Valda Dalton as Bingo woman
 Guy Martin as Policeman
 Michel Maillot as Good Humour man
 Hanka Posnanska as Flower woman
 George R. Robertson as Tennis pro
 Elsa Pickthorne as Georgette
 Donald Ewer as Les Turnbull

References

External links

1973 films
1973 drama films
Canadian drama films
English-language Canadian films
Films directed by George Kaczender
1970s English-language films
1970s Canadian films